The 2006 Asia Oceania Korfball Championship was held in Hong Kong with 7 national teams in competition, from July 4 to 9. The top 4 teams qualified for the 2007 World Championships.

First round

Second round classification matches
3rds vs 2nds

Final round 

5th place

Semifinals

6th-7th places

3rd-4th places

Final

Final standings

References

See also
Asia-Oceania Korfball Championship

Asia-Oceania Korfball Championship
Asia Oceania Korfball Championship
Korfball in Hong Kong